Kaj Derakht may refer to the following places in Iran:
 Kaj Derakht, Fariman
 Kaj Derakht, Mashhad
 Kaj Derakht, Torbat-e Heydarieh

See also
 Kaj (disambiguation)